Sarkastodon ("meaty tooth") is an extinct genus of mammal within the creodont family Oxyaenidae that lived during the early to late Eocene, 48.6 to 37.2 million years ago. It was a large, carnivorous animal that lived in what is today China and Mongolia. Sarkastodon is known only from a skull and jawbones. Sarkastodon was probably a hypercarnivore that preyed on large mammals in its range during the Late Eocene, such as brontotheres, chalicotheres, and rhinoceroses.

Discovery 
The type specimens of S. mongoliensis are known from Eocene deposits from the Irdin Manha Formation of Mongolia. Additional material referred to Sarkastodon is known from the Ulan Shireb beds ( from the holotype locality) of Inner Mongolia. These specimens were discovered by Walter W. Granger in 1930, on an expedition to the Gobi Desert.

Palaeobiology 

Sarkastodon was a hypercarnivore, with hyaena-like dentition specialised in bone-cracking. The sharp, slicing premolars (which form roughly rectilinear cutting blades) and crushing molars enabled Sarkastodon to eat both bone and flesh. It was probably an ambush predator, not a fast runner.

Phylogeny 
The phylogenetic relationships of genus Sarkastodon are shown in the following cladogram.

See also
 Mammal classification
 Oxyaeninae

References

External links 

 Artistic reconstruction of Sarkastodon, shown waiting for Andrewsarchus to finish eating from a dead brontothere.

Oxyaenidae
Eocene mammals of Asia
Eocene genus first appearances
Eocene genus extinctions
Fossil taxa described in 1938